The Earth Awards is an aspirational platform for consumer-driven ideas that challenge designers and innovators to build a new economy.  It is an annual competition since 2007, aiming to "transform visionary ideas into market-ready solutions by offering finalists the unique opportunities to pitch their project to world business leaders". The Awards are open to students, graduates and industry professionals - the public is invited to submit innovations to be judged.

Background
The Earth Awards originated from a collective of designers, architects, scientists, writers, and entrepreneurs.  The event was founded by Nicole Ting-Yap, as an initiative of the ecoStyle Project, established in 2007 by the Malaysian Government.

Current Organization
As of 2010 the event is produced by NYC Inc, and Karena Albers of the organization kontentreal is the Director of the Awards.

Submissions are judged by a panel that includes Yves Behar, Richard Branson, David DeRothschild, Bill McKibben, and TreeHugger Founder Graham Hill.

Categories and Criteria
The Earth Awards is a global search for creative solutions designed for the 21st century. The award represents six categories: Built Environment, Product, Future, Systems, Fashion, and Social Justice.

Ideas, great or small, realized or prototypes, are considered but must distinguish themselves in six criteria: Achievable, Scalable, Measurable, Useful, Original and Ecological.

Annual results

The Earth Awards 2010 
One finalist from each of the six categories will have their sustainable designs showcased in September 2010.   This will include an exhibition in London, in conjunction with the Financial Times’ Sustainable Business Conference and gala dinner that will invite CEOs, entrepreneurs and venture capitalists to match innovation with investment.

The 2010 Selection Committee includes:

 Paola Antonelli, Curator for Architecture and Design, Museum of Modern Art
 Yves Béhar, Founder, Fuseproject
 Sir Richard Branson, Founder and CEO, Virgin Group
 Graydon Carter, Editor-In-Chief, Vanity Fair
 Majora Carter, President, The Majora Carter Group
 Tony Chambers, Editor-in-Chief, Wallpaper* Magazine
 Alexandra Cousteau, Founder, Blue Legacy International
 David de Rothschild, Founder, Adventure Ecology
 The Gyalwang Drukpa, Spiritual Leader, The Drukpa Lineage
 Rick Fedrizzi, President and CEO, United States Green Building Council
 Julie Gilhart, Fashion Director, Barneys New York
 Dr. Jane Goodall, Jane Goodall Institute & UN Messenger of Peace
 Scott Mackinlay Hahn, Co-founder, Rogan and Loomstate
 Peter Head, Director, ARUP
 Graham Hill, Founder of TreeHugger
 Khaldoon Khalifa Al Mubarak, CEO, Mubadala Development Company
 Yang Lan, Chairwoman, Sun Television
 Ira C. Magaziner, Chairman, Clinton Climate Initiative
 Bill McKibben, Writer, Environmentalist
 Barry Nalebuff, Professor, Yale School of Management
 Sergio Palleroni, Co-founder and Director, BaSiC Initiative
 Karim Rashid, Founder, Karim Rashid Inc.
 Jonathan Rose RIBA, Principal, AECOM and Masterplanning Practice Leader
 Cameron Sinclair, Founder, Architecture for Humanity
 Werner Sobek, Founder, Werner Sobek Engineering + Design
 Philippe Starck, Founder, Starck Network
 Diane von Furstenberg, Founder, DvF
 Dilys Williams, Director, Center for Sustainable Fashion
 Ken Yeang, Principal, Llewelyn Davies Yeang

The Earth Awards 2009 
In 2009, The Earth Awards ceremony took place in New York City.  Neri Oxman's project FAB.REcology won the grand prize for combining principles of biomimicry with the design and construction of built environments.

A prestigious and eclectic panel served on the Selection Committee, including: Paola Antonelli, Adam Bly, David Buckland, Antonio de la Rua, David de Rothschild, Nicky Gavron, Scott Hahn, Peter Head, Graham Hill, Dr. Dan Kammen, Yang Lan, Thom Mayne, Michael McDonough, Khaldoon Khalifa Al Mubarak, Barry Nalebuff, Sergio Palleroni, John Picard, Werner Sobek, Terry Tamminen, Suzanne Trocmé, Dilys Williams, and Dr. Kenneth Yeang.

References

External links
The Earth Awards

Earth Awards
American awards